Reginald Flint (16 July 1903 – 19 June 1981) was an English competitive swimmer and breaststroker who represented Great Britain in the 1924 Summer Olympics and 1928 Summer Olympics, and England in the 1930 British Empire Games. In 1924 he was eliminated in the semi-finals of the 200-metre breaststroke event.  Four years later he was eliminated in the first round of the 200-metre breaststroke competition at the 1928 Olympics. At the 1930 Empire Games he won the bronze medal the 200-yard breaststroke contest.

See also
 List of Commonwealth Games medallists in swimming (men)

References

External links
Reginald Flint's profile at Sports Reference.com

1903 births
1981 deaths
Sportspeople from Sheffield
English male swimmers
Male breaststroke swimmers
Olympic swimmers of Great Britain
Swimmers at the 1924 Summer Olympics
Swimmers at the 1928 Summer Olympics
Swimmers at the 1930 British Empire Games
Commonwealth Games bronze medallists for England
Commonwealth Games medallists in swimming
Medallists at the 1930 British Empire Games